Lyall Munro may refer to:

Lyall Munro Snr (1931–2020), Aboriginal Australian land rights activist and elder
Lyall Munro Jnr (born 1951), Aboriginal activist and leader, son of Lyall Munro Snr